The Theatre of Digital Art (ToDA) is an exhibition space for digital art and a venue for digital theatre located at Souk Madinat in Jumeirah, Dubai, United Arab Emirates.

ToDA was announced in 2019, providing a 1,800 m2 immersive art space, with surround sound and large projection screens on the ceiling and  all the walls. It opened its doors to the public in 2020. It provides a multimedia and multi-sensory exhibition space. ToDA exhibits work by digital artists around the world. It also hosts concerts.

ToDA enables three forms of digital art: contemporary immersive installation art, multimedia exhibitions, and virtual reality art.  It includes digital displays of classical art, augmented with surround sound music and visual effects. The inaugural exhibition presented the artworks of nine artists, including works by Paul Cézanne, Wassily Kandinsky, Claude Monet, Vincent van Gogh, etc.

See also
 Digital art
 Digital performance
 Digital theatre

References

External links
 ToDA website
 
 

2020 establishments in the United Arab Emirates
Art galleries established in 2020
Theatres in the United Arab Emirates
Arts centres in the United Arab Emirates
Culture in Dubai
Tourist attractions in Dubai
Contemporary art galleries in Asia
Art museums and galleries in the United Arab Emirates
Digital art